The 1999 1. divisjon, Norway's second-tier football league, began play on 17 April 1999 and ended on 17 October 1999. The league was contested by 14 teams, and the top two teams won promotion to Tippeligaen, while the third placed played a promotion-playoff against the 12th-placed team in Tippeligaen to win promotion. The bottom four teams were relegated to the 2. divisjon.

Haugesund and Bryne won direct promotion to Tippeligaen, while Start was promoted after having won 3-2 on aggregate against Strømsgodset in the promotion-playoff. Lofoten, Skjetten, Hødd and Clausenengen was relegated to the 2. divisjon.

League table

Top goalscorers

17 goals:
 Anders Blomquist, Haugesund
16 goals:
 Kristian Bye-Andersen, Eik Tønsberg
14 goals:
 Tommy Nilsen, Lyn
12 goals:
 Trond Nordseth, Start
11 goals:
 Geir Atle Undheim, Bryne
 Bala Garba, Haugesund
 Ole Petter Skonnord, Kjelsås
 Jarle Wee, Haugesund
10 goals:
 Lars Berg, Raufoss
 Fredrik Horn, Lofoten
 Stein Berg Johansen, Lofoten
 Mikael Edvardson, L/F Hønefoss
 Kjell Roar Kaasa, Lyn

Promotion play-offs
Start (3rd in 1. divisjon) won the play-offs against Strømsgodset (12th in Tippeligaen) 3–2 on aggregate. 

Start won 3–2 on aggregate and was promoted to Tippeligaen. Strømsgodset was relegated to 1. divisjon.

See also
 1999 Tippeligaen
 1999 2. divisjon
 1999 3. divisjon

References

Norwegian First Division seasons
2
Norway
Norway